Pogost is a rural locality (a village) in Kopninskoye Rural Settlement, Sobinsky District, Vladimir Oblast, Russia. The population was 29 as of 2010.

Geography 
Pogost is located 25 km southwest of Sobinka (the district's administrative centre) by road. Zhokhovo is the nearest rural locality.

References 

Rural localities in Sobinsky District